az-Za'ayyem is a Palestinian village in the Jerusalem Governorate, located 3 kilometers east of Jerusalem in the central West Bank. According to the Palestinian Central Bureau of Statistics, the village had a population of 2,459 in 2006. The healthcare facilities for az-Za'ayyem according to the Ministry of Health are obtained in East Jerusalem.

History

1967, aftermath  
After the 1967 Six-Day War, az-Za'ayyem has been under Israeli occupation.

After the 1995 accords, 3.8% (or 236 dunams) of the land was classified as Area B, the remaining 96.2% (or 5,896 dunams) as Area C.

Israel has confiscated land from az-Za'ayyem in order to construct two Israeli settlements: 
406 dunams for Ma’ale Adumim,
138 dunams for Mishor Adumim (industrial zone).

az-Za'ayyem lies close to Highway 1 to Jerusalem and the az-Za'ayyem check point in the separation barrier.

References

External links
Az Za'ayyem Village (Fact Sheet), Applied Research Institute–Jerusalem ARIJ
Az Za'ayyem Village Profile, ARIJ
Aerial photo, ARIJ
 Locality Development Priorities and Needs in Az Za'ayyem, ARIJ

Villages in the West Bank
Jerusalem Governorate
Municipalities of the State of Palestine